Old-fashioned may refer to:

 Old fashioned (cocktail), a whiskey cocktail
 Old Fashioned glass, a type of drinking glass named after the cocktail
 Old Fashioned (film), a 2015 film by Rik Swartzwelder
 "Old-fashioned" (short story) a 1976 short story by Isaac Asimov
 Old Fashioned (horse), a racing horse
 Old-fashioned three, a basketball term
 Old-fashioned doughnut, a type of doughnut
 Old-fashioned oats, a type of rolled whole oats

See also
 I'm Old Fashioned (disambiguation)
 Obsolescence
 Tradition
 Old Style (disambiguation)
 Old school (disambiguation)